Thomas Henry Marshall ( – 28 December 1909) was an Australian politician, publican and merchant who served as a member of the Western Australian Legislative Council from 1894 to 1895.

Biography
Marshall was born in Western Australia, with his precise birthplace having been listed as Baylup, Toodyay or Fremantle. He was the son of Louisa Harris or Tulk and Edward Marshall, a convict who originally arrived in Western Australia aboard Ramillies in 1854.

Marshall served as a councillor for the Western Australian towns of Fremantle (resigned in 1895) and Cue (from 1906). He served in the Western Australian Legislative Council as the third member for West Province from 1894 to 1895.

In his final years, Marshall operated as licensee of the Great Fingall and Day Dawn hotels. On 28 December 1909, he died in Day Dawn, aged 47, due to gastroenteritis. He was buried at Cue Cemetery.

Notes

References

1862 births
1906 deaths
19th-century Australian politicians
Australian merchants
Members of the Western Australian Legislative Council
People from Fremantle
Infectious disease deaths in Western Australia